The Blue Streak may refer to:

The school newspaper at The Charter School of Wilmington, a high school  in Wilmington, Delaware, USA
Kentucky Blue Streak, a 1935 American film directed by Bernard B. Ray
 The British Blue Streak missile project of the 1950s
 The Blue Streak (1926 film), directed by Noel M. Smith